Johan "Sheriffen" Persson (born 20 June 1984) is a Swedish former footballer who played as a midfielder.

Career 
He began his senior career at the Scanian club IFK Hässleholm in the lower divisions, before getting signed by Mjällby AIF in 2006.

Two years later he made a switch to Landskrona BoIS in the Swedish second tier, Superettan. Acting as a regular starter on the defensive midfield he made 81 appearances for the side during the following three seasons, managing to score on 10 occasions.

In the off season of 2010 he moved abroad for the first time in his career, signing with Esbjerg fB in the Danish Superliga. But Persson failed to make an impact at the team and left by mutual consent a few months later, having played only 6 league games, when his short term-contract ended.

He then returned to his native country, signing a long term-deal with Östers IF on 17 July 2011. Persson would remain at the club for another few years being a part of a promotion campaign to Allsvenskan in 2012. During these successful years he was nicknamed as "Sheriffen" (the sheriff) by then manager Roar Hansen.

When Öster got relegated from the 2013 Allsvenskan, after a short stint in the highest division, Persson instead moved to the Stockholm-based club Hammarby IF in Superettan. Once again he would enjoy an immediate promotion to Allsvenskan, also establishing himself as the vice captain of the club.

During the 2015 and 2016 season he appeared as a regular starter for Hammarby in Allsvenskan. He has also renewed his tie to the club, signing a new contract that will last until the summer of 2018.

On 30 June, midway through the 2017 season, Persson and Hammarby chose to part separate ways. Persson opted to live closer to his family and cited "personal reasons" for his departure. In total, Persson made 82 league appearances for Hammarby, scoring 4 goals.

Persson signed a two and a half year-contract with Helsingborgs IF on 5 July 2017.

References

External links
 

1984 births
Living people
Östers IF players
Esbjerg fB players
Landskrona BoIS players
Mjällby AIF players
Hammarby Fotboll players
Helsingborgs IF players
Danish Superliga players
Superettan players
Swedish footballers
Allsvenskan players
Association football midfielders